Jefe is a 2018 Spanish-Portuguese comedy film directed by Sergio Barrejón and written by Natxo López and Marta Piedade. It stars Luis Callejo and Juana Acosta.

Plot 
César, a rude and self-centered businessman, seems to be on the brink of losing everything until a night janitor at his office helps him find some much-needed sensitivity.

Cast

Production 
Jefe was produced by Potenza Producciones, Bowfinger International Pictures and Jefe La Película AIE alongside Fado Filmes, and it had support of ICAA, Ibermedia and the Madrid regional administration.

Release
The film premiered on 15 April 2018 at the 21st Málaga Spanish Film Festival. Distributed by Súper 8, it was theatrically released in Spain on 6 July 2018.
It was released on 26 October 2018 on Netflix streaming.

Accolades 

|-
| align = "center" | 2019 || 33rd Goya Awards || Best Adapted Screenplay || Marta Sofía Martins, Natxo López ||  || align = "center" | 
|}

See also 
 List of Spanish films of 2018

References

External links 
 
 

2018 films
2018 comedy films
Spanish comedy films
Portuguese comedy films
2010s Spanish-language films
Bowfinger International Pictures films
2010s Spanish films